Northfield Center Township is one of the nine townships of Summit County, Ohio, United States.  The 2000 census found 4,931 people in the township.

Geography
Located in the northern part of the county, it borders the following townships and municipalities:
Northfield - north
Macedonia - northeast
Hudson - southeast corner
Boston Heights - south
Boston Township - southwest
Sagamore Hills Township - west

Several municipalities are located in what was originally part of Northfield Center Township:
A small part of the village of Boston Heights, in the southeast
The village of Northfield, in the north
Much of the city of Macedonia, in the east

Name and history
It is the only Northfield Center Township statewide.

Government
The township is governed by a three-member board of trustees, who are elected in November of odd-numbered years to a four-year term beginning on the following January 1. Two are elected in the year after the presidential election and one is elected in the year before it. There is also an elected township fiscal officer, who serves a four-year term beginning on April 1 of the year after the election, which is held in November of the year before the presidential election. Vacancies in the fiscal officership or on the board of trustees are filled by the remaining trustees.

References

External links
Township website
County website

Townships in Summit County, Ohio
Townships in Ohio
Cleveland metropolitan area